Moasula is a village on the island of Savai'i in Samoa. It is situated on the south coast of the island in the district of Satupa'itea. The population is 685.

References

Populated places in Satupa'itea